All in the Family is the debut studio album from Lordz of Brooklyn. It was released on April 18, 1995, by American Recordings.

Track listing
 Saturday Nite Fever - 4:04
 Papers - 3:32
 Brooklyn Pride - 3:55
 The Bad Racket - 3:45
 White Trash - 5:12
 American Made - 3:25
 Tails From the Rails - 4:12
 Out Ta Bomb - 3:27 
 Can Ya Dig It - 2:54
 Pull Your Card - 4:03
 Unda The Boardwalk - 3:54
 L.O.B. Sound - 4:16

References

 http://www.discogs.com/Lordz-Of-Brooklyn-All-In-The-Family/release/870152

1995 debut albums
American Recordings (record label) albums
Lordz of Brooklyn albums